Pseudoboa is a genus of snakes in the family Colubridae. The genus is endemic to South America.

Species
The genus Pseudoboa contains six species which are recognized as being valid.
Pseudoboa coronata 
Pseudoboa haasi 
Pseudoboa martinsi 
Pseudoboa neuwiedii 
Pseudoboa nigra 
Pseudoboa serrana 

Nota bene: A binomial authority in parentheses indicates that the species was originally described in a genus other than Pseudoboa.

References

Further reading
Freiberg M (1982). Snakes of South America. Hong Kong: T.F.H. Publications. 189 pp. . (Genus Pseudoboa, p. 107).
Schneider JG (1801). Historiae Amphibiorum naturalis et literariae Fasciculus Secundus continens Crocodilos, Scincos, Chamaesauras, Boas, Pseudoboas, Elaps, Angues, Amphisbaenas et Caecilias. Jena: F. Frommann. vi + 374 pp. + Plates I-II. (Pseudoboa, new genus, p. 281). (in Latin, with some French in Addenda).

Pseudoboa
Snake genera